Pan Gate, Pan Men, or Panmen (Suzhou Wu: Boe men) is a historical landmark in Suzhou, Jiangsu, China.  It is located on the south-west corner of the Main Canal or encircling canal of Suzhou. Originally built during the Spring and Autumn period in the state of Wu, historians estimate it to be around 2,500 years old.  It is now part of the Pan Gate Scenic Area.  It is known for the "three landmarks of Pan Gate".  They are the Ruiguang Pagoda, the earliest pagoda in Suzhou built in 247, the Wu Gate Bridge, the entrance to the gate at that time over the water passage and the highest bridge in Suzhou at the time, and Pan Gate.  The Ruigang Pagoda is constructed of brick with wooden platforms and has simple Buddhist carvings at its base.

Pan Gate is part of the ancient city wall built in 514 BCE that surrounded and protected Suzhou.  Pan Gate was the only entrance to the wall that surrounded ancient Suzhou.  It is also known in China for its architecture.  It is so famous for its complex of both land and water city gates that many times, people directly refer to it as the "Land and Water Gate". In order to attract more tourists, in recent years, the city of Suzhou has renovated the old wall and built many other attractions around the original gate in the Pan Gate Scenic Area.

The present structure was built in the 11th year of the reign of Zhizheng (1333-1370 AD) at the end of the Yuan dynasty (1271-1368).

See also
City Wall of Suzhou

References

AAAA-rated tourist attractions
Buildings and structures in Suzhou
City walls in China
Gates in China
Tourist attractions in Suzhou
Major National Historical and Cultural Sites in Jiangsu